Carrier Strike Group 5, also known as CSG 5 or CARSTRKGRU 5, is the U.S. Navy carrier strike group assigned to the United States Pacific Fleet and permanently forward deployed to the U.S. 7th Fleet. As of June 2015, CSG 5 includes three s and Destroyer Squadron Fifteen (CDS 15), which serves as the Sea Combat Commander and is responsible for seven assigned s.

CSG 5 is responsible for unit-level training, integrated training, and material readiness for the group's ships and aviation squadrons. As the only continuously forward deployed carrier strike group, the CSG-5 staff does not stand down when the strike group is in Yokosuka, but instead continues to maintain command responsibilities over deploying Carrier Strike Groups and independently deployed cruisers, destroyers, and frigates that operate in the Seventh Fleet operating area. The commander and staff are also responsible for the higher level Task Force 70 duties throughout the year in addition to the CSG-5 duties. The composition of the strike group in immediate proximity of the Ronald Reagan varies throughout the year.

The CSG 5 Commander also serves as Battle Force Seventh Fleet and Commander, Task Force (CTF 70) for 7th Fleet. In these responsibilities, CSG 5 serves as the Commander of all surface forces (carrier strike groups, independently deploying cruisers, destroyers and frigates) in the 7th Fleet area of responsibility. CTF 70 also serves as the Theater Surface Warfare Commander (TSUWC) and Theater Integrated Air Missile Defense Commander (TIAMDC) for Seventh Fleet.

Ronald Reagan and the ten surface combatant ships operate out of Yokosuka, Japan, while CVW 5 operates out of Iwakuni, Japan, when not embarked on Ronald Reagan. Together, these units form the U.S. Navy's only continuously forward deployed (and largest) carrier strike group.

Subordinate units

Flagship

Other ships

CVW 5 consists of 9 Squadrons

Other Squadrons

History

World War II
On 25 April 1944, Rear Admiral Frank D. Wagner formed Carrier Division Five when he assumed command aboard USS Wasp and USS Hornet in Pearl Harbor. Rear Admiral Joseph J. Clark succeeded Wagner and commanded the division through 12 months of sustained combat operations in the Western Pacific and waters surrounding Japan, working for both Third Fleet (ADM William Halsey) and Fifth Fleet (ADM Raymond Spruance). This included participation in the First and Second Philippine Sea Battles and the Iwo Jima and Okinawa campaigns. Clark was succeeded by Rear admiral Arthur C. Davis in July 1945.

Korean War

During the Korean War, Rear Admiral G.R. Henderson commanded Carrier Division 5 and served as Commander, Task Force (CTF) 70 and 77 aboard USS Princeton (CV 37). Carrier Division 5 moved back and forth between Yokosuka, Japan and the Korean Theater, serving as CTF 70 or 77 on multiple occasions.

On 1 August 1955, Carrier Division 5 comprised Essex (Bremerton), Kearsarge, and Shangri-La (both homeported in San Diego).

Vietnam War

Prior to the Vietnam War, the location of Carrier Division 5 moved between several Pacific ports and utilized rotating carriers from the West coast of the U.S. as its flagship. During the Vietnam War, 12 different commanders led Carrier Division 5 and Task Force 77 in numerous combat deployments to the Vietnam War zone. Beginning in 1964 Carrier Group Five was permanently deployed to the Western Pacific and dual-hatted CTF 70/77, homeported at Naval Air Station Cubi Point in the Philippines.

In December 1971, Commander Carrier Division 5, Rear Admiral Damon W. Cooper, led Task Force 74 aboard Enterprise to the Indian Ocean following the outbreak of the Indo-Pakistani War of 1971.

Carrier Division 5 became Carrier Group 5 on 30 June 1973, and in October, Carrier Group 5 arrived in Yokosuka, Japan aboard USS Midway marking the first forward deployment of a complete Carrier Battle Group in a Japanese port (the associated Air Wing, CVW-5, moved into Atsugi, Japan this same year). On 1 January 1974, still homeported at Cubi Point, the group was responsible for three carriers: 63 and 64 both homeported at San Diego and  homeported at Alameda. Carrier Group Five shifted its forward deployed location from Cubi Point, Republic of Philippines to Yokosuka in mid-1991. Midway remained in Yokosuka for 18 years and was relieved by Independence (CV 62) on 11 September 1991.

Afghanistan and Iraq

In the lead up to the Gulf War, Rear Admiral Daniel March, Commander, Carrier Group 5, became Commander, Task Force 154 (Battle Force Zulu), part of Naval Forces Central Command. The Task Force directed four carriers (CV-61, CV-66, and CVN-71) in the Arabian Sea/Persian Gulf during Operation Desert Storm.

On 11 August 1998,  relieved Independence as the Carrier Group 5 flagship. After the terrorist attacks in New York City and Washington, DC, on 11 September 2001, the Kitty Hawk Battle Group was ordered to deploy to the Indian Ocean and was later involved in combat missions against the Taliban and Al Qaida in Afghanistan. The ships got underway again in January 2003 with orders to deploy to the Persian Gulf as part of the build-up of military forces in the area in preparation for the war against the regime of Saddam Hussein in Iraq. Kitty Hawk arrived on station late February/early March and from 20 March on, participated in air strikes against targets in Iraq as part of Operation Iraqi Freedom.

 relieved Kitty Hawk on 25 September 2008. Carrier Group Five was renamed Carrier Strike Group 5 on 1 October 2004.

Humanitarian assistance and disaster relief

In 2011, Carrier Strike Group 5 participated in two humanitarian assistance operations, Operation Tomodachi in Japan and support to Thailand during their worst flooding in 50 years.

On 11 November 2013 George Washington Carrier Strike Group (GWCSG) was ordered to the Republic of the Philippines in response to Typhoon Haiyan/Yolanda. The strike group, commanded by Rear Adm. Mark Montgomery, was assigned as Joint Force Maritime Component Commander for the disaster relief which was named Operation Damayan, and the force was assigned to Joint Task Force 505, commanded by Marine Corps Lt. Gen. John E. Wissler (Commanding General, III Marine Expeditionary Force). For Operation Damayan, the strike group included USS George Washington (CVN-73), six surface combatants, 23 helicopters from three squadrons, three Military Sealift Command ships and two amphibious ships all crewed by 8,000 sailors, The strike group concentrated its relief efforts on the islands of Leyte and Samar and the cities of Tacloban and Guiuan, delivering nearly 1,000,000 pounds of food, water and medical supplies and transporting more than 2,500 displaced personnel. Yolanda had reached speeds up to 195 miles per hour (mph), gusts up to 235 mph and landfall waves of 50 feet. According to the Philippine government's national disaster risk reduction and management council, the super typhoon impacted more than 4.2 million people across 36 provinces in the Philippines.

Hull swap
On 14 January 2014, the U.S. Navy announced that  will replace George Washington as the flagship of Carrier Strike Group 5. George Washington was scheduled to undergo her mid-life complex refueling and overhaul at Newport News Shipbuilding shipyard in Newport News, Virginia. Carrier Air Wing Five will continue to be assigned to Carrier Strike Group 5.

2017 deployment
In May 2017, Ronald Reagan completed a Selected Restricted Availability maintenance in Yokosuka, Japan, and joined the USS Carl Vinson and Carrier Strike Group 1 in the Sea of Japan amid increased tensions over North Korea's nuclear weapons program. The rest of CSG 5 including the USS Shiloh, USS Barry, USS McCampbell, USS Fitzgerald, and USS Mustin arrived in early June. The two Strike Groups were also joined by the Japan Maritime Self-Defense Force vessels JDS Hyūga and JDS Ashigara.

On 17 June, the USS Fitzgerald was involved in a collision with the Philippine-flagged cargo vessel MV ACX Crystal in the Sea of Japan. The Fitzgerald suffered heavy damage and seven members of her crew were killed with three more injured, including the ship's CO Cmdr. Bryce Benson. The ship was taken to Yokosuka, Japan, for repairs after the injured crew members were evacuated by helicopter.

Commanders

Group commanders since 2000 have included:

Current force

Surface combatants
 Nimitz-class aircraft carrier
 Ticonderoga-class cruiser
 Arleigh Burke-class destroyer

Fixed-wing aircraft
 F/A-18E/F Super Hornet
 EA-18G Growler
 E-2D Hawkeye
 C-2A Greyhound

Rotary wing aircraft
 MH-60S Seahawk
 MH-60R Seahawk

References

External links
 COMCARSTRKGRU FIVE

Carrier Strike Groups
United States military in Japan
Military units and formations established in 1944
1944 establishments in the United States